Stachys albens, also known as whitestem hedgenettle or white hedgenettle, is a mint endemic to California. S. albens flowers have a 2-lipped, 5-lobed calyx, which is densely cob-webby and white to pinkish in color with purplish veins.  The plant is fuzzy all over, with opposite, triangular, serrate leaves, a square stem, a layered spike of many small flowers, and a minty smell if bruised.

Distribution
Stachys albens occurs between 0 (sea level) and 9000 feet, in wet, swampy to seepy places in the following plant communities:
Foothill oak woodland.
Coastal sage scrub.
Yellow pine forest.
Red fir forest.
Lodgepole pine forest.
California mixed evergreen forest.
Wetland-riparian.
Pinyon-juniper woodland - Mojave and Colorado Deserts.

References

External links
Jepson Manual treatment: Stachys albens
Stachys albens - U.C. Photo gallery

albens
Endemic flora of California
Flora of the Sierra Nevada (United States)
Natural history of the Central Valley (California)
Flora without expected TNC conservation status